Jordan Evans Allen (born April 25, 1995) is a former American professional soccer player who played as a midfielder for Real Salt Lake.

Career

Early career
Born in Rochester, New York, Allen played for the Real Salt Lake Arizona Academy from 2011 to 2012 before playing a season at the University of Virginia in 2013.

Real Salt Lake
On December 31, 2013 it was announced that Allen had signed a homegrown contract with Real Salt Lake of Major League Soccer. He made his professional debut on March 8, 2014 against the LA Galaxy, in which he came on in the 90th minute for Joao Plata as Salt Lake won 1–0. On March 29, 2015, after coming on as a substitute in a match against Toronto FC, he scored his first professional goal in the 90th minute, just moments after Toronto had tied the game in a 2–1 win.

After playing over 40 games in his first two full seasons, Allen's progress has been hampered by injury, only playing two matches since the end of the 2016 season.

Allen retired from playing professional soccer at the end of the 2019 season due to injury problems.

Career statistics

References

External links 
 

1995 births
Living people
American soccer players
Virginia Cavaliers men's soccer players
Real Salt Lake players
Real Monarchs players
Homegrown Players (MLS)
Association football midfielders
Soccer players from New York (state)
Sportspeople from Rochester, New York
Major League Soccer players
USL Championship players
United States men's youth international soccer players
United States men's under-20 international soccer players